Juyom District is a district (bakhsh) in Larestan County, Fars Province, Iran. At the 2006 census, its population was 19,601, in 4,068 families.  The District has one city: Juyom. The District has two rural districts (dehestan): Harm Rural District and Juyom Rural District.

References 

Larestan County
Districts of Fars Province